San Bartolomé de Tirajana is a village and a Spanish municipality in the south-eastern part of the island of Gran Canaria in the Las Palmas province in the Canary Islands.

The municipality contains the large beach resorts of Maspalomas, including Playa del Inglés and San Agustín, and the Pilancones natural park. Most of the population lives along the Atlantic coastline. The GC-1 motorway passes through the southern part of the municipality, and connects it with Las Palmas de Gran Canaria and the Gran Canaria Airport.

Location 
Located in the south of the island, 54.5 kilometers from the island's capital, the municipality has a triangular shape with a vertex in the interior and a wide base that covers a good part of the southern coast of Gran Canaria.

With an area of 333.13 km², it is the largest municipality on the island, covering more than a fifth of the island's surface area.

The municipal capital, the rural nucleus of Tunte, is located at 850 meters above sea level, reaching the maximum municipal level at 1,957.3 meters above sea level at the elevation known as Morro de la Agujereada.

Orography 
The centre of the coast of the municipality is characterised by its long and wide golden sand beaches, as well as the dune field of Maspalomas and its brackish water pool. The northern end of the coast is, on the contrary, rocky, and the southern end is cliff.

Above the coast there is a wide, fully developed coastal plain, which gradually rises up and, furrowed by deep ravines, heads towards the mountains in the centre of the island.

Evolution of urban land, according to the Cadastre (2010 data): urban land in 2006: 1586 hectares; urban land in 2007: 1612 hectares; urban land in 2008: 1635 hectares; urban land in 2009: 1649 hectares; urban land in 2010: 1657 hectares, representing 5.2% of the total land of the municipality.

Climate 
The weather conditions are given by the leeward position of the island and, therefore, to the protection of the humid winds of the northeast. This results in low and concentrated rainfall in the winter months and pleasant temperatures almost all year round.

The average annual temperature is 15,8 °C, with January being the coldest month at 12,1 °C and August the hottest at 20,5 °C. As for rainfall, the average is 307 mm per year.

This justifies the fact that the high tourist season extends from September-October to April, the time of year when the mild temperatures make the island a destination for European tourism.

Nature

Protected areas 
The municipality has a large part of its surface area included in the Canary Islands Network of Natural Protected Areas. The Riscos de Tirajana Natural Monument, the Pilancones Natural Park, the Fataga Protected Landscape, the Maspalomas Dunes Special Nature Reserve and the Juncalillo del Sur Site of Scientific Interest are all within its boundaries. In addition, it shares with the neighbouring municipalities the Nublo Rural Park and the Los Marteles Special Nature Reserve.

All these areas are also included in the Natura 2000 Network as Special Areas of Conservation - SACs, to which the Amurga and Taurus massifs are added, as well as the coastal strip from the tip of Tarajalillo to that of Maspalomas due to the existence of underwater tallow meadows known as sebadales. The surface of the protected landscape of Fataga, Pilancones and the rural park of El Nublo are also Special Protection Areas for Birds -SPA-.

The municipality also has the public utility mountains of San Bartolome, La Plata and Maspalomas, as well as Montaña del Rey.

Economy 
Tourism is the single crop of the coastal area, while as we go up, we see cooler weather, more fertile land and more agricultural activity.

Rustic land (29,615 hectares), divided into 9,369 cadastral plots: pasture and uncultivated land 85.90%; slow-growing timber species 9.5%; irrigated land 2.3%; fruit trees 1.1%; dry farming 1%. (Source: Cadastre, 2009)

Tourism, the main economic activity in the municipality, is currently in a phase of adaptation. Different studies and organized plans that attend to the current demand and elaborated with the participation of different institutions such as the ULPGC, City Hall, Cabildo and the Government of the Canary Islands, are being put into practice in order to highlight the identity of the municipality and its innumerable values.

They also attend to the modernization of the accommodation plant that, being a pioneer municipality at a tourist level, shows in its urban structure the passage of time, trying to preserve the artistic or heritage value and replacing what has become obsolete.

These plans include new buildings such as a multi-adventure theme park and a high performance sports centre linked to the world of motor sports in Punta de Tarajalillo. Also in Punta de Tarajalillo, the creation of the Wake Park Feliz theme park, dedicated mainly to the offer of water sports.

Historical population

Settlements

A
 Agualatente
 Aldea Blanca
 Arteara
 Ayacata
 Ayagaures
B
 Bahia Feliz
 Berriel
C
 Calderin
 Campo Internacional
 El Canalizo
 Casas Blancas
 Los Caserones de Fataga
 Castillo del Romeral
 Los Cercados 
 Cercados de Araña
 Cercados de Espino
 Chira
 Ciudad de Lima
 La Culata
F
 Fataga
 Las Filipinas
 La Florida
H
 Hoya Gercia
 Hoya Grande
 Hoya de Tunte
 Los Hortigones
 Huesa Bermeja
 La Humbria
J
 Juan Grande
L
 Lomito de Taidía
 Lomo de la Palma
M
 Maspalomas
 El Matorral
 Media Fanega
 Los Meloneras
 La Mimbre
 La Montaña 
 Montaña La Data
 Montaña de Rosiana
 Monteleon
 El Moral
P
 El Pajar
 Los Palmitos
 Pasito Blanco
 Pedrazo
 Perera
 La Plata
 Playa del Aguila
Playa del Inglés
R
 Risco Blanco
 Risco la Candelilla
 Los Rodeos
S
 El Salobre
 San Agustín
 San Fernando
 Santa Águeda
 El Sequero 
 Los Sitios
 Sonnenland
T
 El Tablero
 Taidía
 Tarajalillo
 Las Tederas
 Trejo
 Tunte (San Bartolomé de Tirajana)

Education

The British School of Gran Canaria maintains its South Campus in this municipality.

Climate
It is located on the leeward portion of the island. Humid winds cover the northeast in the summer months. Precipitation is lower than the northern part of the island and temperatures are slightly higher than in the north all year round.

Sister cities 

 Alajuela, Costa Rica
 Elche, Spain
 Segovia, Spain

See also
List of municipalities in Las Palmas

References

External links

Municipalities in Gran Canaria